Sebastian Urzendowsky (born 28 May 1985) is a German actor. He has appeared in more than thirty films since 1998.

Selected filmography

References

External links
 

1985 births
Living people
Male actors from Berlin
German male film actors
German male television actors
21st-century German male actors